Brenna Tarrant (born 3 November 2001) is an Australian rules footballer who plays for Sydney in the AFL Women's (AFLW). She has previously played for Melbourne.

Early Life
Tarrant was raised in Blaxland, New South Wales in the Blue Mountains west of Sydney. Tarrant grew up supporting the Sydney Swans from a very young age and was schooled at St Columba's Catholic College. 

Tarrant's junior football began at the Emu Plains/Glenmore Lions and Kellyville/Rouse Hill Magpies she joined the East Coast Eagles Premier Division senior side in 2018 contesting a Grand Final in 2019. She was still at school when she was recruited to the AFLW, moving to Melbourne following her graduation.

AFLW career
In October 2019, Tarrant joined Melbourne.

She made her AFLW debut in Round 5, 2020 against the West Coast Eagles at Casey Fields playing 3 games before the COVID-19 pandemic ended competition for the year.

In May 2022, Tarrant joined expansion club Sydney.

References

External links

 

Living people
2001 births
Melbourne Football Club (AFLW) players
Australian rules footballers from New South Wales
Sportswomen from New South Wales
Sydney Swans (AFLW) players